Rune Husk is a 2017 EP by of Montreal and has been said to sound like "Ziggy Stardust".

Track listing

References

External links
>

2017 EPs
Of Montreal albums
Polyvinyl Record Co. EPs